The Abbey Road E.P. is an EP by Red Hot Chili Peppers, released in the UK in May 1988 through EMI America as a way of introducing UK fans to the band's back catalog as they were touring the UK that year. Out of the five tracks included on this EP, four had already been previously released on the band's first three albums while the other would end up on their fourth album Mother's Milk in tribute to Hillel Slovak, the band's original guitarist who died of a heroin overdose and plays guitar on the track. All songs on the EP were also featured on the band's hits compilation, What Hits!?.

The only "new" track at the time of release was a cover of the song "Fire" by Jimi Hendrix, which was recorded during the sessions for The Uplift Mofo Party Plan and included in a different mix as the B-side to "Fight Like a Brave".

Cover photo
The title and cover were a tribute to The Beatles' famous album Abbey Road. Like the Beatles, the cover depicts the four bandmembers walking across a zebra crossing in single file, the twist being that they are all naked except for white tube socks covering their genitals. Wearing only socks in this manner was something they regularly employed in their stage shows at the time. 

British photographer Chris Clunn took the cover photo in February 1988. He had to do the shoot twice over consecutive days, because the first time he realised he'd had no film in his camera. Clunn told Kerrang: "It was the first sleeve picture I'd ever taken and I was a bit nervous. I had two cameras – one black and white, one colour. I could finish a roll of film in about 40 seconds so it should have been very quick. It was only when I got back home that I realised I hadn't put any film in the cameras." Clunn told the band's UK record company EMI, which organised the shoot, that the films had fallen out of his pocket and been run over by a lorry. "I actually got two new films and rode over them on a scooter as 'evidence'. I got a phone call about half six the next morning asking me to do it again... Fortunately, both the band and EMI bought the story."

Clunn said another idea for the shoot was to replicate the cover of Please Please Me, where the Beatles are looking down over the stairwell inside EMI's London headquarters in Manchester Square. "We decided against that because they [the Chili Peppers] couldn't get their todgers out," Clunn said.

Track listing

Release history
The Abbey Road E.P. (CD, EP, Comp) 	EMI-Manhattan Records 	CDP-7-90869-2 	    US 	1988
The Abbey Road E.P. (12", EP) 		EMI-Manhattan Records 	E1-90869 	    US 	1988
The Abbey Road E.P. (12", EP) 		EMI-Manhattan Records, 	12MT 41, E1-90869   US 	1988
The Abbey Road E.P. (12", EP) 		EMI-Manhattan Records 	K 060 20 2633 6 Europe 	1988
The Abbey Road E.P. (7", EP) 		EMI-Manhattan Records 	MT 41 	            UK 	1988
The Abbey Road E.P. (CD, EP, Comp) 	EMI-Manhattan Records 	CDP-7-90869-2 	    UK 	1988

Note
Some versions of 12" do not include "Fire" while the 7" version does not include "Fire" and "Catholic School Girls Rule"

References

Red Hot Chili Peppers EPs
1988 debut EPs
Capitol Records EPs
EMI Records EPs